William Clowes may refer to:

William Clowes (Primitive Methodist) (1780–1851), Englishman who was one of the founders of Primitive Methodism
William Clowes (printer) (1779–1847), founded the printing firm William Clowes Ltd.
William Laird Clowes (1856–1905), British journalist and historian
William Clowes (surgeon) (1540–1604), English surgeon and author